Vladimir Nikolaevich Belyayev is a Kazakhstani professional ice hockey coach. He is honored coach of the Republic of Kazakhstan. Belyaev was the head coach of HC Astana from 2011 until 2013. His son Maksim Belyayev is an ice hockey player and playing for Yugra Khanty-Mansiysk at the Kontinental Hockey League.

Coaching career
1997–1998 Kazakhstan U20 national team - head coach
2000–2002 Kazakhstan U18 national team - assistant coach
2002–2003 Kazakhstan U18 national team - head coach
2003–2004 Kazakhstan U20 national team - head coach
2004–2005 Kazakhstan U18 national team - assistant coach
2005–2006 Kazzinc-Torpedo - head coach
2006–2008 Kazakhstan U18 national team - head coach
2007–2008 Kazzinc-Torpedo-2 - head coach
2008–2010 Kazzinc-Torpedo - head coach
2010–2011 Kazzinc-Torpedo-2 - head coach
2011–2013 HC Astana - head coach

References

Living people
1958 births
Sportspeople from Oskemen
Kazzinc-Torpedo head coaches
Kazakhstani ice hockey coaches